Salvarani was an Italian professional cycling team that existed from 1963 to 1972. The team was sponsored by the Italian kitchen components maker Salvarani.

Major wins

1965
 Overall Giro d'Italia, Vittorio Adorni
Overall Tour de Romandie, Vittorio Adorni
 Overall Tour de France, Felice Gimondi

1966
Paris–Roubaix, Felice Gimondi
Overall Tour de l'Avenir, Mino Denti
Giro di Lombardia, Felice Gimondi

1967
 Overall Giro d'Italia, Felice Gimondi
 Points classification, Dino Zandegù
Grand Prix des Nations, Felice Gimondi

1968
Milan–San Remo, Rudi Altig
 Overall Vuelta a España, Felice Gimondi
Critérium des As, Felice Gimondi
Grand Prix des Nations, Felice Gimondi

1969
 Overall Giro d'Italia, Felice Gimondi

1970
 Points classification Tour de France, Walter Godefroot
Overall Tour de Suisse, Roberto Poggiali

References

External links

Defunct cycling teams based in Italy
1963 establishments in Italy
1972 disestablishments in Italy
Cycling teams established in 1963
Cycling teams disestablished in 1972